Dumaran, officially the Municipality of Dumaran,  is a 3rd class municipality in the province of Palawan, Philippines. According to the 2020 census, it has a population of 23,528 people.

The municipality covers the southern part of the namesake Dumaran Island (where the poblacion is located), as well as a portion on Palawan Island. It is bounded on the north-east by Municipality of Araceli, on the south by Sulu Sea, on the south-west by Roxas, and on the north-west by the municipality of Taytay. Dumaran also celebrate the Kalabukay Festival - Kalabukay refers to a local bird that is common to the people of Dumaran. The Municipality of Dumaran is in rich with natural resources. The majority of the people living in Dumaran are farmers and fishermen.

Geography

Barangays
Dumaran is politically subdivided into 16 barangays, 9 barangays on the mainland of Palawan, and 7 barangays on Dumaran Island.

Climate

Demographics

The dominant language is Cuyonon, while Bisaya and Tagalog are spoken as secondary languages.

Economy

Culture
In relation to its foundation day June 14, Dumaran celebrates Kalabukay Festival annually from June 14–18.

References

External links

Dumaran Profile at PhilAtlas.com
[ Philippine Standard Geographic Code]
Philippine Census Information
Local Governance Performance Management System

Municipalities of Palawan